"Never Be the Same" is a song by American singer Camila Cabello from her debut studio album, Camila (2018). It was digitally released as a single on December 7, 2017, and sent to US contemporary hit radio on January 9, 2018. Cabello gave her first televised performance of the song on The Tonight Show Starring Jimmy Fallon in January 2018. In the US, "Never Be the Same" peaked at number six on the Billboard Hot 100 and was certified four-times platinum. It peaked at number 1 in Flanders and Croatia as well as in the top 10 in thirteen additional countries. The music video was directed by Los Angeles-based director Grant Singer and released on March 8, 2018. The duet version of the song, featuring singer Kane Brown, was released on April 27, 2018.

The song was written by Cabello, Noonie Bao, Sasha Sloan, and its producer Frank Dukes, and co-producers Jarami. "Never Be the Same" received positive reviews from music critics, who praised its drum hook.

Background
Cabello first performed the song during the B96 Summer Bash '17 on June 24, 2017. It was later included on the set list of her opening act for Bruno Mars' 24K Magic World Tour, firstly titled "I'll Never Be the Same" back then. Cabello wrote the lyrics of the song, inspired by a relationship she had a couple years back. The album includes two versions of the song. The original contains the line, "Nicotine, heroin, morphine" which is substituted in the radio edit version: "Nicotine, rushing me, touching me". On the week of the album release, Billboard reported that, Cabello revealed in a recent interview that she wants to rework one of her songs into a country song with a country singer. Says Joey Arbagey, executive VP of A&R of Epic Records, Sam Hunt was being considered then, but Cabello later chose Kane Brown and it worked out perfectly.

This song has received plenty of praises from many country and pop/rock singers since it was out, including Brown, Keith Urban, Kelsea Ballerini, James Barker from James Barker Band, Demi Lovato, Ellie Rowsell from Wolf Alice and more.
Urban and Ballerini also covered the song on Urban's Graffiti U World Tour. Cabello tweeted about her excitement for the cover song along with a clip of the performance.

Composition and lyrics

"Never Be the Same" has been described as a power pop, electro, dark pop ballad. The upbeat track features Cabello singing falsetto in the pre-chorus. According to sheet music published by Sony/ATV Music Publishing on Musicnotes.com, "Never Be the Same" is composed in the key of C Major and set in common time at a slow tempo of 65 beats per minute. Cabello's voice ranges from a low of D3 to a high of G5, and the music has a C-G-Dm-F chord progression.

The song features booming drums and echoed effects, mimicking Hal Blaine's opening drum phrase from The Ronettes' 1963 song "Be My Baby." The song's lyrics incorporate themes of a pain-is-pleasure type of love. They were described by Neil McCormick of The Daily Telegraph as "a melodrama about addictive love".

Critical reception
Newsdays Glenn Gamboa wrote in his album review, "Cabello is at her peak on ["Never Be the Same"] which shows off what sets her apart from the pop pack. [...] That she can quickly switch to her full voice for the desperate chorus is the mark of a star." In Rolling Stone, Rob Sheffield considered that Cabello "really hits her stride in "Never Be the Same," which sounds like Brian Eno's alien-prog masterwork Another Green World souped up into sputtering glitz-pop [...] It's [Cabello] at her best – even at her most tormented, she sounds totally confident and totally herself." In an unfavorable review, Patrick Ryan of USA Today felt the song was "overproduced" with "frequently indecipherable lyrics".

Rolling Stone listed it 4th of "50 Best Songs of 2018", "After the slow-burning piano grind of 'Havana', Camila switches gears for a gigantic electro ballad that proves this girl can handle any kind of song. In 'Never Be The Same', she's an infatuation junkie who can't stop going back to the wrong lover, because she just can't get enough. For the big climax, Camila gasps for breath over the classic 'Be My Baby' drum hook – somewhere, Ronnie Spector must be proud."

Accolades

Commercial performance
The song entered at number 61 on the US Billboard Hot 100 as the week's top debut with 30,000 copies sold and 6.1 million streams for its first week of release. It fell to number 98 in its second week on the Hot 100. The song fell off the chart the following week; however, it later re-entered at number 71, following the premiere of the unofficial music video posted on Cabello's personal YouTube channel. Following the release of the parent album and being sent to radio as a single, "Never Be the Same" ascended from number 65 to number 30, becoming her fourth solo top 40 Hot 100 entry. In its 20th charting week, it ascended from number 13 to 6, thus becoming her third top 10 as a solo artist. The song has also been certified 3× Platinum by the Recording Industry Association of America (RIAA). It became her third single to reach number one on the Mainstream Top 40 airplay chart, making Cabello the sixth solo female to top that chart with the first two singles from her debut album. It has spent a total of three weeks atop the Mainstream Top 40 chart.

In the United Kingdom, "Never Be the Same" entered the UK Singles Chart at number 41 on the chart dated December 21, 2017. It rose to number seven in its sixth week, following the release of the album. The song has been certified Platinum by the British Phonographic Industry (BPI).

Music video
An accompanying but unofficial music video for "Never Be the Same" was released on Cabello's personal YouTube channel on December 29, 2017. The video is a montage of real footage, which includes Cabello's infancy, childhood and adolescence. It mainly includes footage from moments she had in 2017, such as receiving awards at the 2017 MTV EMAs and Billboard Women in Music, performing live and also clips from her previous music videos, "Crying in the Club" and "Havana".

The official music video, directed by Grant Singer, was released on March 8, 2018. The video features a mix of professional shots with Cabello wearing couture in various modern landscapes including cliffs, the ocean, and people-sized glass boxes. Cabello is also juxtaposed against amateurish footage of her in a white robe in a hotel room. At the end of the video, she tells the camera man in the hotel room to "Stop, turn it off." Natalie Maher of Billboard believed that Cabello "seems to give all sides of herself in the video", comparing the "retro aesthetic" of the hotel room and the "debonair couture gowns in modern set ups" together. Johnni Macke of People praised the video's concept, stating that "It's modern, funky and very interesting to watch".

Live performances
Cabello gave the first televised performance of the song on The Tonight Show Starring Jimmy Fallon on January 10, 2018. She sung in front of a screen that projected clips of herself, Marilyn Monroe's movie scenes, storms and a variety of landscapes. She also performed the song on Good Morning America, The Ellen DeGeneres Show, Dancing on Ice, Quotidien,<ref>{{cite web |title=Camila Cabello : "Never Be the Same" en live pour Quotidien |trans-title=Camila Cabello: "Never Be the Same" live for 'Quotidien |url=https://www.tf1.fr/tmc/quotidien-avec-yann-barthes/videos/camila-cabello-never-be-the-same-live-quotidien.html |via=TMC |publisher=TF1 Group |language=fr |date=June 19, 2018}}</ref> and Le Rico Show sur NRJ. In addition, on December 13, 2022, the season finale of The Voice season 22, she performed a duet of the song with her only finalist Morgan Myles.

 Awards and nominations 

Formats and track listings

Credits and personnel
Credits adapted from the liner notes of Camila.

Recording
 Recorded at Windmark Studios, Santa Monica, California
 Mixed at MixStar Studios, Virginia Beach, Virginia
 Mastered at the Mastering Palace, New York City, New York

Personnel

 Camila Cabello – songwriting, vocals
 Frank Dukes – songwriting, production
 Jarami – songwriting. production
 Noonie Bao – songwriting
 Sasha Sloan – songwriting
 Bart Schoudel – recording
 Serban Ghenea – mixing
 John Hanes – engineering
 Dave Kutch – mastering

Charts

Weekly charts

Year-end charts

Certifications

 

Release history

Cover versions
James Barker Band cover

On November 7, 2018, the Canadian band James Barker Band released their Spotify Singles'' live session EP,  which is the first-ever Spotify Single to be recorded in Canada and released globally, recorded at Revolution Studios, Toronto, featuring a brand new country cover of "Never Be the Same".

On December 13, 2018, James Barker Band released a music video for their cover of "Never Be the Same". The official music video for James Barker Band's cover of "Never Be the Same" is featuring World of Dance contestants Luka & Jenalyn's emotionally powerful style of dance, filmed in one day at ProdStudio in Toronto, directed by Ben Knechtel with video work by Lee Zavitz.

The lead singer, James Barker, explains the band's connection to Cabello's 2017 hit song and the thought-process behind their version of the track, that they landed on this song because it is just a plain and simple hit, and the chorus melody would have been a hit no matter the genre or generation.

Keith Urban and Kelsea Ballerini cover
On January 17, 2018, Country singers Keith Urban and Kelsea Ballerini covered the song on Urban's Graffiti U World Tour. Cabello tweeted about her excitement for the cover song along with a clip of the performance.

Wolf Alice cover
On May 15, 2018, the British four-piece alternative rock band Wolf Alice performed this song on BBC Radio 1's Live Lounge, where lead singer Ellie Rowsell using two different mics to give her vocals some spacey, atmospheric depth. Prior to the performance, Rowsell admitted she "always gets nervous" before these types of gigs, but "you'd never guess it while watching her boldly tackle one of the year's biggest pop hits", as is "Never Be the Same" by Camila Cabello.

See also
 List of Billboard Digital Song Sales number-one singles of 2018
 List of Billboard Adult Top 40 number-one songs of 2018
 List of Billboard Mainstream Top 40 number-one songs of 2018
 List of Billboard Hot 100 top-ten singles in 2018

References

External links

2010s ballads
2018 singles
American power pop songs
Camila Cabello songs
2017 songs
Pop ballads
Songs written by Noonie Bao
Songs written by Camila Cabello
Syco Music singles
Epic Records singles
Songs written by Frank Dukes
Songs written by Sasha Alex Sloan
Song recordings produced by Frank Dukes
Electro songs
Power pop songs